John Cowan, Lord Cowan (1798–1878) was a Scottish judge who rose to be a Senator of the College of Justice.

Life

He was born on 6 July 1798. He is thought to be the son of Richard Cowan WS an Edinburgh lawyer working at Drummond Place in the 1820s.

He qualified as an advocate around 1825.

In 1830 he is operating as an advocate from 30 Drummond Place (possibly his father's office) and from 1840 at 2 North Charlotte Street off Charlotte Square in Edinburgh.

He was created a Senator in 1851. At this stage he lived at 4 Ainslie Place on the prestigious Moray Estate in western Edinburgh.

In later life he lived at Elmbank on Whitehouse Loan in south Edinburgh.

He died in Edinburgh on 1 August 1878 aged 80. He is buried with his family in "Lords Row" on the western wall of Dean Cemetery.

Family
He was married to Annabella McCartney (1806–1858). They had several daughters.

Artistic Recognition
His early calotype photograph (around 1845) by the pioneer photographers Hill & Adamson is held by the Scottish National Portrait Gallery.

References

1798 births
1878 deaths
Alumni of the University of Edinburgh
Senators of the College of Justice
Burials at the Dean Cemetery
19th-century Scottish judges